Baron Grey de Wilton is a title that has been created twice, once in the Peerage of England (1295) and once in the Peerage of Great Britain (1784). The first creation was forfeit and the second creation is extinct.

History

First creation
The first creation was generally dated to 23 June 1295, when Reginald de Grey was summoned to an assembly prior to the Model Parliament that was summoned that November, as Lord Grey de Wilton. 
Burke's Peerage notes that the June "assembly in question is not now recognized as a bona fide Parl[iament]", but that Reginald had earlier been summoned to the "assembly called a full Parl[iament] of 29 May 1290". 
This branch of the Grey family of aristocrats was based at Wilton Castle on the Welsh border in Herefordshire. The Greys of Wilton, as well as the other old noble families bearing the name of Grey/Gray, are descended from the Norman knight Anchetil de Greye. Wilton Castle itself passed from the family when the 13th baron was forced to sell it to raise his ransom after being captured in France. Sir Thomas Grey, the 15th baron, was attainted in 1603, forfeiting his titles and honours, after being convicted of treason for his alleged involvement in the Bye Plot against King James I. Grey never married. The attainder against him was not reversed prior to his death. His two sisters would have been his co-heiresses but for the attainder; one of them, Bridget, married Sir Roland Egerton, 1st Baronet, and they were ancestors of the recipient of the second creation below.

Second creation

The second creation was in 1784, when Sir Thomas Egerton (1749–1814) was created Baron Grey de Wilton, of Wilton Castle, with remainder to the heirs male of his body. He was a member of the Egerton family and had in 1756 succeeded to his father's Grey Egerton baronetcy. The 1st baronet had married Bridget Grey, the sister of Sir Thomas Grey. In 1801, the 1st Baron Grey de Wilton was also made Viscount Grey de Wilton and Earl of Wilton, of Wilton Castle in the County of Hereford, in the Peerage of the United Kingdom. The latter titles were created with remainder to the second and younger sons successively of his daughter Eleanor, wife of Robert Grosvenor, 1st Marquess of Westminster.

On the first earl of Wilton's death in 1804, the Grey de Wilton barony became extinct, as he had no sons, while the Grey Egerton baronetcy passed to a distant relative. The titles of Earl of Wilton and Viscount Grey de Wilton passed, according to the special remainder, to the 1st earl's grandson, Thomas Grosvenor (1799–1882), who adopted the surname of Egerton and became the 2nd earl. These titles are still extant.

Grey family

Ancestors
Henry de Grey was granted the manor of Grays Thurrock, Essex in 1195 and had six sons.
Sir John de Grey, father of the 1st baron Grey of Wilton

Barons Grey de Wilton (1295)
Reginald de Grey, 1st Baron Grey de Wilton (d. 1308)
John Grey, 2nd Baron Grey de Wilton (1268–1323)
Henry Grey, 3rd Baron Grey de Wilton (1282–1342)
Reginald Grey, 4th Baron Grey de Wilton (1312–1370) married Maud Bourtetourt, said to have been the daughter of Sir John de Bourtetourt.
Henry Grey, 5th Baron Grey de Wilton (1342–1396), son of Reginald Grey and Maud, married Elizabeth Talbot, daughter of Gilbert Talbot and Petronilla Butler. They had a daughter, Margaret Grey (d. 1 June 1454), who married Sir John Darcy, 5th Lord Darcy of Knayth, 4th Lord Meinell 
Richard Grey, 6th Baron Grey de Wilton (1393–1442)
Reginald Grey, 7th Baron Grey de Wilton (1421–1493) 
John Grey, 8th Baron Grey de Wilton (d. 1498)
Edmund Grey, 9th Baron Grey de Wilton (d. 1511)
George Grey, 10th Baron Grey de Wilton (d. 1515) succeeded his father Edmund but died before reaching majority.
Thomas Grey, 11th Baron Grey de Wilton (1497–1518) succeeded his brother George but died before reaching majority.
Richard Grey, 12th Baron Grey de Wilton (1507–1520) succeeded his brother Thomas but died before reaching majority.
William Grey, 13th Baron Grey de Wilton (d. 1562) succeeded his brother Richard
Arthur Grey, 14th Baron Grey de Wilton (1536–1593)
Thomas Grey, 15th Baron Grey de Wilton (1575–1614) Title attainted 1603; extinct 1614.

Egerton family

Barons Grey de Wilton (1784)
Thomas Egerton, 1st Baron Grey de Wilton (1749–1814) (created Earl of Wilton in 1801)
 succeeded as Earl of Wilton according to the special remainder by his grandson, Thomas Grosvenor (1799–1882)

 see Earl of Wilton

References

1295 establishments in England
Forfeited baronies in the Peerage of England
Extinct baronies in the Peerage of Great Britain
Noble titles created in 1295
Noble titles created in 1784